Aziatic is the fourth studio album by the rapper AZ, released on June 11, 2002.

Background
After two albums that received vastly differing responses (Pieces of a Man in 1998 and 9 Lives in 2001), his fourth album is considered AZ's comeback album, which restored his credibility. The album features AZ's flow and style over melodic, soulful production. It includes a duet between AZ and his long-time friend and collaborator, Nas, "The Essence", which was nominated for a Grammy for Best Rap Performance By A Duo Or Group. The album sold over 500,000 copies and was certified Gold by the RIAA.

Critical reception
The album was mostly well received by critics. One such positive review from Brad Mills at Allmusic, says, "AZ has been looked upon to do amazing things with his music. Has he lived up to those high expectations? On this album he has. From start to finish, the beats on this album are complex, inventive, and almost perfectly suited for AZ's style of rhyming. He's carefully crafted this album rather than slapped it together overnight to meet his quota, and it shows. It helps immensely that he's brought along people like DR Period, Az Izz, Nas, and Buckwild, but they don't outshine the younger AZ and he holds his own well."

He continues by writing, "Lyrically, musically, and historically, AZ has come up with his best work in a long time on this album."

Track listing

Chart history
Album

Singles

Samples
"Once Again"
"Welcome Back" by John Sebastian
"A-1 Performance"
"She Can Wait Forever" by George Duke
"Wanna Be There"
"I Just Want To Be There" by Ronnie Dyson
"The Essence"
"Musical Love" by Mary Jane Girls
"Fan Mail"
"Each Day I Cry A Little" by Eddie Kendricks
"Paradise (Life)"
"Just As Long As We Have Love" by Wilbert Longmire
"I'm Back"
"Loving You The Second Time Around" by Eddie Kendricks
"Hustler"
"I'm A Bachelor" by The Temptations
"Rebirth"
"Important Project" by Keith Mansfield
"Aziatic (Outro)"
"Life's A Bitch" by Nas Feat. AZ
"Doe Or Die" by AZ

References

External links
 Aziatic at Discogs

2002 albums
Albums produced by Buckwild
Albums produced by L.E.S. (record producer)
Motown albums
AZ (rapper) albums